Roberto Díaz (born 3 March 1953) is an Argentine footballer. He played in six matches for the Argentina national football team in 1979. He was also part of Argentina's squad for the 1979 Copa América tournament.

References

External links
 

1953 births
Living people
Argentine footballers
Argentina international footballers
Footballers from Buenos Aires
Argentine expatriate footballers
Argentine expatriate sportspeople in Mexico
Expatriate footballers in Mexico
Association football forwards
Chacarita Juniors footballers
Estudiantes de Buenos Aires footballers
Racing Club de Avellaneda footballers
Tampico Madero F.C. footballers
Tigres UANL footballers
Club América footballers
Club León footballers
C.D. Arturo Fernández Vial footballers
Club Atlético Banfield footballers
Club Atlético Douglas Haig players
Expatriate footballers in Chile